Ram Mandir is a Hindu temple that is being built in Ayodhya, Uttar Pradesh, India, at the site of Ram Janmabhoomi, according to the Ramayana the birthplace of Rama, a principal deity of Hinduism. The temple construction is being supervised by the Shri Ram Janmabhoomi Teerth Kshetra. The ground-breaking ceremony was performed on 5 August 2020 by India’s prime minister Narendra Modi. The temple premises will include temples dedicated to deities Surya, Ganesha, Shiva, Durga, Vishnu and Brahma.

History

Background

Rama, an incarnation of god Vishnu, is a widely worshiped Hindu deity. According to the ancient Indian epic, Ramayana, Rama was born in Ayodhya. In the 16th century, the Mughals constructed a mosque, the Babri Masjid which is believed to be the site of the Ram Janmabhoomi, said to be birthplace of Rama. A violent dispute arose in the 1850s.

In the 1980s, the Vishwa Hindu Parishad (VHP), belonging to the Hindu nationalist family Sangh Parivar, launched a new movement to reclaim the site for Hindus and to erect a temple dedicated to the infant Rama (Ram Lalla) at this spot. In November 1989, the VHP laid the foundations of a temple on land adjacent to the disputed mosque. On 6 December 1992, the VHP and the Bharatiya Janata Party organised a rally at the site involving 150,000 volunteers, known as kar sevaks. The rally turned violent, and the crowd overwhelmed the security forces and tore down the mosque.

The demolition resulted in several months of intercommunal rioting between India's Hindu and Muslim communities, causing the death of at least 2,000 people, and triggering riots all over the Indian subcontinent. A day after the demolition of the mosque, on 7 December 1992, The New York Times reported that over 30 Hindu temples across Pakistan were attacked, some set on fire, and one demolished. The government of Pakistan closed school and offices in a day of protest. Hindu temples in Bangladesh were also attacked. Some of these Hindu temples that were partially destroyed during the retaliation of Babri Masjid have since remained that way.

On 5 July 2005, five terrorists attacked the makeshift Ram temple at the site of destroyed Babri Mosque in Ayodhya, India. All five were shot dead in the ensuing gunfight with the Central Reserve Police Force (CRPF), while one civilian died in the grenade attack that the attackers launched in order to breach the cordoned wall. The CRPF suffered three casualties, two of whom were seriously injured with multiple gunshot wounds.

A 1978 and 2003 archaeological excavation by the Archaeological Survey of India (ASI) found evidence indicating that Hindu temple remains had existed on the site. Archeologist KK Muhammad accused several historians of undermining the findings. Over the years, various title and legal disputes also took place, such as the passage of the Acquisition of Certain Area at Ayodhya Ordinance, 1993. It was only after the 2019 Supreme Court verdict on Ayodhya dispute that it was decided the disputed land be handed over to a trust formed by the Indian government for the construction of a Ram temple. The trust was eventually formed under the name Shri Ram Janmabhoomi Teerth Kshetra. Five acres of land was allocated for the mosque 22 km away in the city in Dhannipur village. On 5 February 2020, it was announced in the Parliament that the Narendra Modi government had accepted a plan to construct the temple.

Prior construction efforts
In the 1980s, the VHP collected funds and bricks with "Jai Shree Ram" written on them. Initially the centre and state governments had agreed upon the conducting of the  outside of the disputed site. However, on 9 November 1989, a group of VHP leaders and Sadhus laid the foundation stone by digging a  pit adjacent to the disputed land. The  of the sanctum was laid here. Kameshwar Chaupal (a Dalit leader from Bihar) became one of the first people to lay the stone.

Deity
Ram Lalla Virajman, the infant form of Rama, an avatar of Vishnu, is the presiding deity of the temple. Ram Lalla's dress is stitched by tailors Bhagwat Prasad and Shankar Lal; Shankar Lal is a fourth generation tailor to Rama's idol.

Ram Lalla was a litigant in the court case over the disputed site since 1989, being considered a "juristic person" by the law. He was represented by Triloki Nath Pandey, a senior VHP leader who was considered as Ram Lalla's next 'human' friend.

According to the temple trust, the final blueprint includes temples dedicated to Surya, Ganesha, Shiva, Durga, Vishnu and Brahma in the temple premises.

Architecture 

The original design for the Ram temple was prepared in 1988 by the Sompura family of Ahmedabad. The Sompuras have been part of the temple design of over 100 temples all over the world for at least 15 generations, including the Somnath temple. The chief architect of the temple is Chandrakant Sompura. He was assisted by his two sons Nikhil Sompura and Ashish Sompura, who are also architects.

A new design, with some changes from the original, was prepared by the Sompuras in 2020, in accordance with vastu shastra and the shilpa shastras. The temple will be 235 feet wide, 360 feet long and 161 feet high. Once complete, the temple complex will be the world's third largest Hindu shrine. It is designed in the Gujara-Chaulukya style of Northern Indian temple architecture. A model of the proposed temple was showcased during the Prayag Kumbh Mela in 2019.

The main structure of the temple will be built on a raised platform and will have three storeys. It will have five mandapas in the middle of the garbhagriha (sanctum sanctorum) and the entry — the three mandapas Kudu, Nritya, and Rang; and two mandapas for the Kirtan and Prarthana on the other side. In Nagara style, the mandapas are to be decorated with shikhara. The tallest Shikhara will be that above the Garbhagriha. The building will have a total of 366 columns. The columns will have 16 idols each to include the incarnations of Shiva, the 10 Dashavataras, the 64 Chausath Yoginis, and the 12 incarnations of the goddess Saraswati. The width of the stairs will be 16 feet. In accordance with scriptures dedicated to the design of temples dedicated to Vishnu, the sanctum sanctorum will be octagonal. The temple will be built in 10 acres and 57 acres of land will be developed into a complex with a prayer hall, a lecture hall, an educational facility and other facilities like a museum and a cafeteria.

Construction 
The Shri Ram Janmabhoomi Teerth Kshetra trust began the first phase of construction of the Ram Temple in March 2020. However, the COVID-19 pandemic lockdown in India followed by the 2020 China–India skirmishes caused a temporary suspension of the construction. During ground-leveling and excavation of the construction site a Shivaling, pillars and broken idols were found. On 25 March 2020, Ram's idol was moved to a temporary location in the presence of Chief Minister Yogi Adityanath. In preparation for its construction, the Vishwa Hindu Parishad organised a ' ', in which individuals would gather at different places to chant the Vijay Mahamantra – , on 6 April 2020. This was said to ensure "victory over hurdles" in the construction of the temple.

Larsen & Toubro offered to oversee the design and construction of the temple free of cost and is the contractor of the project. Central Building Research Institute, National Geophysical Research Institute and the Indian Institute of Technology (such as those Bombay, Guwahati and Madras) are assisting in areas such as soil testing, concrete and design. Reports emerged that the Indian Space Research Organisation (ISRO) had identified a stream of the Sarayu which flows under the temple. Tata Consulting Engineers has been designated as a project management consultant.

The construction work will be accomplished with 600 thousand cubic feet of sandstone Bansi mountain stones from Rajasthan. Thirty years ago, more than two hundred thousand bricks etched with the 'Sri Rama' in several languages had arrived from various parts of the country; these will be utilized in the foundation. Traditional techniques will be used to create the shrine while at the same time it will be made sure that the shrine will be strong enough to sustain natural calamities such as earthquakes. There will be no use of iron in the construction of the temple. The fusing of the stone blocks will require ten thousand copper plates.

Bhoomi Poojan ceremony 
The temple construction officially started again after a Bhoomi Poojan ceremony on 5 August 2020. Three-day long Vedic rituals were held ahead of the ground-breaking ceremony, which revolved around the installation of a 40 kg silver brick as the foundation stone by the Prime Minister of India, Narendra Modi.

Soil was also sent from various Hindu temples, Gurudwaras and Jain Temples across the nation to bless the upcoming temple. Among the many was Sharada Peeth located in Pakistan. Soil was also sent form the four pilgrimage locations of Char Dham. Temples in United States, Canada, Trinidad and Tobago, Guyana and Suriname held a virtual service to celebrate the occasion. Rama's image were shown at Times Square. All 7,000 temples in a 7 km radius of Hanumangarhi were also asked to join in the celebrations by lighting diyas. Muslims devotees in Ayodhya who consider Rama as their ancestor also looked forward to the bhoomi-puja. Spiritual leaders from all faiths were invited on the occasion.

On 5 August, Prime Minister Modi first offered prayers at Hanumangarhi to seek blessings of Hanuman for the day's events. Following this the ground breaking and foundation stone laying ceremony of Ram Mandir took place. Yogi Adityanath, Mohan Bhagwat, Nritya Gopal Das and Narendra Modi gave speeches. Modi started his speech with Jai Siya Ram and he went on to urge those in attendance to chant Jai Siya Ram. He stated, "the call of Jai Siya Ram is resonating not only in the city of Lord Ram but throughout the world today" and that "Ram Mandir will become the modern symbol of our traditions". Narendra Modi also paid his respects to the many who had made sacrifices for the Ram temple. Mohan Bhagwat also thanked L. K. Advani for his contributions to the movement to get the temple built. Modi also planted a sapling of Parijat tree (night-flowering jasmine). Due to the COVID-19 pandemic, attendees at the temple were limited to 175.

Reactions to the ground-breaking ceremony
Some priests and religious leaders complained that the ceremony did not follow proper ritual procedures, claiming, among others, that 5 August was not a ritually auspicious date and that the function did not include a havan. In this respect, writer Arundhati Roy, a noted critic of Modi, pointed out that the chosen date marked one year since the revocation of the special status of Jammu and Kashmir, arguing that the decision to schedule the ceremony for 5 August, which she claimed was an inauspicious date with no significance in the Hindu calendar, symbolized the conclusion of a period "in which India under Modi has formally declared itself a Hindu Nation, the dawning of a new era." Among the international community, Pakistan made an official statement through its Pakistan Foreign Office related to the temple. The Times of India also reported that post Ram Mandir ground–breaking, Pakistani Hindus fear violence in the same way as what happened in 1992.

Various Indian political leaders hailed the ground-breaking ceremony. While some openly celebrated it, others worded their statements carefully. Many expressed hope in furthering the country's progress by following the ideals of Ram. Soon after the ground-breaking ceremony, residents of Ayodhya expressed hope in improvements of job opportunities and development of the city, through tourism generated by the temple.

2021present 

In August 2021, a viewing location was created for the public to watch the construction. Following the ground-breaking ceremony, up to 40 feet of debris were removed and the remaining earth compacted. The foundation was made using roller-compacted concrete. A total of 47-48 layers, each layer one feet high, was completed by mid-September 2021. Due to electricity supply issues in Mirzapur, the process for cutting sandstones was slowed down. At the beginning of 2022 a video was released by the temple trust showing the planned construction of the temple in 3D along with other related information.

According to Chief Minister Yogi Adityanath, over 50% of the construction work of the temple was completed by the end of 2022.

In January 2023, Two Rare Shaligram rocks (about 60 million-years-old), of 26 tonnes and the other of 14 tonnes were sent from Gandaki river, Nepal. These rocks are used to carve the idol of Ram Lalla in the sanctum sanctorum.

Crowd-funding, outreach, and allegations 
The temple trust decided to launch a nationwide "mass contact and contribution campaign" aimed at reaching 55-60 crore people. On 15 January 2021, President of India Ram Nath Kovind made the first contribution towards the construction of the Ram Mandir by donating . This was followed by several leaders and eminent personalities across the nation. Nearly 1.50 lakh Vishwa Hindu Parishad activists collected funds from all across the nation. The temple trust not only received donations from Hindu devotees but also from several members of Christian and Muslim communities.

A few individuals including former Karnataka Chief Ministers HD Kumaraswamy and Siddaramaiah strongly questioned the manner of collection of funds. Following the inability to collect funds, a Rashtriya Swayamsevak Sangh affiliated school saw bullying of a headmistress, followed by suspending her, with a similar case in Ballia district. Following allegations of corruption, Tata Consultancy Services was roped in to digitize the accounts.

In popular culture

During the 2021 Delhi Republic Day parade on Rajpath, Uttar Pradesh's tableau showcased a replica of the Ram Mandir. Diwali in 2021 saw small sized replicas of the mandir being constructed.

Slogans 
 (Devanagari: , ISO:) is an expression in Hindi, translating as "the temple will be built there". It is one of the most popular slogans in relation to Ram Janmabhoomi movement and Ram Mandir used as early as 1985-86, popularized in the 1990s, and has a number of variations. The slogan has been used in both positive and negative connotations. It has been a symbol of hope and it has become a part of festivities on one hand, while on the other it has become a part of standup comedy, jokes and memes. In 2019, the slogan was used in the Parliament of India, and has also been used by media houses. The slogan has been used as a threat as well as a vow.

There are variations of the slogan such as one used by Lal Krishna Advani: "". Other variations and adaptations include "", "", "" and "".

Books and films 
In 2020, Kangana Ranaut announced plans to direct a film about the Ayodhya dispute titled Aparajitha Ayodhya, with V. Vijayendra Prasad as the writer; the film would also contain the Bhoomi Puja.

In October 2021, Salman Khurshid published another book, Sunrise over Ayodhya: Nationhood in Our Times, which was about the decline of secularism in India over the construction of the Ram Mandir at Ayodhya. The book became controversial among members of the BJP because one of its chapters compared Hindutva to Islamic terrorism.

See also

 Ayodhya dispute
 Ram Rath Yatra
 List of Hindu temples in India
 Conversion of non-Islamic places of worship into mosques
 Conversion of mosques into non-Islamic places of worship

References

External links 
 

Ayodhya dispute
Hindu temples in Uttar Pradesh
Proposed religious places
Rama temples
21st-century Hindu temples
Buildings and structures in Ayodhya